Munster Reds was formed in 2017 and became a Twenty20 team in the same year. They played their first Twenty20 match in the 2017 Inter-Provincial Trophy against Northern Knights. In total, 35 players have appeared in Twenty20 cricket for Munster Reds.

Stephen Doheny is Munster Reds leading run-scorer in Twenty20 cricket, aggregating 274 runs. Doheny's score of 64, scored in 2018 against North West Warriors is the highest score by a Munster Reds batsman, and Doheny also has the teams best batting average: 39.14. Among the bowlers, Yaqoob Ali has taken more wickets than any other, claiming 17 – eight wickets more than that of the second most prolific bowlers. Harry Tector has the best bowling figures in an innings: he claimed four wickets against North West Warriors in a 2017 match, while only conceding 21 runs. Jamie Grassi has kept wicket in eight of Munster Reds' Twenty20 matches, taking 3 catches and effecting 6 stumpings. Ali has claimed the highest number of catches among fielders, taking 7.

Players are initially listed in order of appearance; where players made their debut in the same match, they are initially listed by batting order.

Key

List of Twenty20 cricketers

References

Munster Reds
Cricketers, Twenty20